The Frontenac Regiment was an infantry of the Non-Permanent Active Militia of the Canadian Militia (now the Canadian Army). In 1936, the regiment was converted from infantry to artillery and now exists as part of the 33rd Medium Artillery Regiment, RCA – currently on the Supplementary Order of Battle. The regiment was named for Frontenac County.

Lineage 

 Originated on 14 September 1866, in Kingston, Ontario, as the 47th Frontenac Battalion of Infantry.
 Redesignated on 8 May 1900, as the 47th Frontenac Regiment.
 Redesignated on 12 March 1920, as The Frontenac Regiment.
 Converted from infantry to artillery on 15 December 1936 and redesignated as the 47th (Napanee) Field Battery, RCA.

Perpetuations 

 146th Battalion, CEF

History

Early history 
On 30 November 1866, the 47th Frontenac Battalion of Infantry was authorized. Its regimental headquarters was at Kingston and had companies at Storrington (Milburn and Inverary), Elginburg, Portsmouth, Garden Island, Wolfe Island and Harrowsmith, Ontario.

North West Rebellion 
On 10 April 1885, the 47th Frontenac Battalion of Infantry mobilized a company for active service that served as part of The Midland Battalion in the Alberta Column of the North West Field Force. On 24 July 1885, the company was removed from active service.

Great War 
On 22 December 1915, the 146th Battalion, CEF was authorized for service, and on 25 September 1916, the battalion embarked for Great Britain. After its arrival in the UK, on 7 October 1916, the battalion’s personnel were absorbed by the 95th Battalion, CEF, where it provided reinforcements for the Canadian Corps in the field. On 17 July 1917, the 146th Battalion, CEF was disbanded.

Organization

47th Frontenac Battalion of Infantry (30 November 1866) 

 Regimental Headquarters (Kingston, Ontario)
 No. 1 Company (Storrington and Milburn, Ontario) (first raised as the 1st Volunteer Militia Company of Storrington - company disbanded on 11 May 1895)
 No. 2 Company (Storrington and Inverary, Ontario) (first raised as the 2nd Volunteer Militia Company of Storrington)
 No. 3 Company (Elginburgh, Ontario) (moved on 2 April 1887 to Sydenham, Ontario)
 No. 4 Company (Portsmouth, Ontario) (disbanded on 31 January 1894)
 No. 5 Company (Garden Island, Ontario) (first raised as the Naval Company - disbanded by 1869) (new No. 5 Company raised on 12 March 1869 in Barriefield, Ontario)
 No. 6 Company (Wolfe Island, Ontario) (moved on 29 May 1885 to Napanee, Ontario)
 No. 7 Company (Harrowsmith, Ontario)

47th Frontenac Battalion of Infantry (16 November 1895) 

 No. 1 Company (Inverary, Ontario) (redesignation of No. 2 Company)
 No. 2 Company (Sydenham, Ontario) (redesignation of No. 3 Company)
 No. 3 Company (Barriefield, Ontario) (redesignation of No. 5 Company; moved on 1 July 1896 to Moscow, Ontario; later moved to Verona, Ontario; moved 15 May 1906 to Fermoy, Ontario; moved 15 April 1913 to Westport, Ontario)
 No. 4 Company (Napanee, Ontario) (redesignation of No. 6 Company)
 No. 5 Company (Moscow, Ontario) (redesignation of No. 7 Company and moved from Harrowsmith, Ontario)
 No. 6 Company (Enterprise, Ontario) (redesignation of No. 8 Company and moved from Tamworth, Ontario)
 No. 7 Company (Odessa, Ontario) (redesignation of No. 10 Company; redesignated on 1 April 1903 as No. 8 Company and moved to Amherst Island, Ontario; later moved on 1 May 1905 to Arden, Ontario)

Battle honours 

 Arras, 1917
 Hill 70
 Ypres, 1917

Notable members 

 Lieutenant Colonel Sir George Airey Kirkpatrick 
 Lieutenant Colonel Thain Wendell MacDowell 
 Lance Corporal John Babcock

Notes and references 

Infantry regiments of Canada
Military units and formations of Ontario
Military units and formations disestablished in 1936